Gianluca Gaetano (born 5 May 2000) is an Italian professional footballer who plays as an attacking midfielder or a left winger for  club Napoli.

He is an academy graduate of Napoli, having joined the club in 2011, and the youngest-ever player in the club's history to have signed a professional contract with the club at the age of 16. On 10 December 2019, Gaetano made his debut in UEFA Champions League against Belgian side Genk.

Early and personal life

Gianluca Gaetano was born and raised in Cimitile, in the Greater Napoli area. He was born into a family of athletes, his older brother Felice Gaetano is also a professional football player, who also came through the Napoli youth system, he also has 2 cousins Michele Peluso and Felice Raiola both of whom are professional footballers.

A lifelong supporter of Napoli, Gaetano joined the Campania club when he was just eleven years old and dreams of one day becoming their Captain.

Club career

Early youth career
Born in Cimitile in Southern Italy just North-East of Naples, Gaetano got his football start with the local team ASD Future Boys di Cimitile at the age of five. During this time at the club, he played with his older brother Felice. While at ASD Future Boys di Cimitile, he along with his older brother were spotted by a Napoli scout, joining their youth system in 2011.
Gaetano joined the youth academy of Napoli in 2010,5, and worked his way up through their youth categories.

In the 2017/18 Season Gaetano went on to score 17 goals with 14 assists in all youth competitions forming a formidable partnership with fellow youth player Ciro Palmieri.

In the 2018/2019 season Gaetano managed to score 5 goals in 6 games in the UEFA Youth League where he stood out against some of the best youth in Europe, his first goal in the competition would come in the 94th minute in a game against Liverpool that ended in a 1-1 draw, he also managed to score a hat trick against Red Star Belgrade in a game Napoli went on to win 5-3.

He went on to Captain the Youth team and scored 22 goals with 8 assists in all competitions which was enough for him to be called up by the Napoli first team by manager Carlo Ancelotti and get his first professional debut for the Napoli first team.

Napoli

In 2016 Gaetano became the youngest ever player to sign a professional contract with Napoli at the age of 16. Gaetano made his professional debut with Napoli in a 2-0 Coppa Italia win over U.S. Sassuolo Calcio on 13 January 2019.

On 12 May 2019, he was called on by Napoli coach Carlo Ancelotti in which he made his first ever Serie A debut in a game against S.P.A.L., which would be marked in tragedy, with his grandmother Carmela dying of a heart attack after a confrontation with neighbours during celebrations.

On 10 Dec 2019 Gaetano would make his first Champions League debut in a home game against Belgian side Genk which Napoli went on to win 4-0 a progressed to the last 16 of the competition.

Loans to Cremonese
On 21 January 2020, he joined Serie B club Cremonese on loan. On 16 February 2020 he scored his first goal for the club (and in the professional football) in a 5-0 win against Trapani. On 18 September 2020 the loan was renewed for the 2020–21 season. After appearing for Napoli in the first two games of the 2021–22 Serie A season, on 31 August 2021 he returned to Cremonese on a new loan.

International career
Gaetano is a youth international for Italy he has represented Italy at almost every youth level, and most recently represented the Italy U19s in a pair of friendlies in October 2018.

Career statistics

Club

References

External links

Profile at the S.S.C. Napoli website
Official Instagram Page

FIGC U17 Profile
FIGC U19 Profile

2000 births
Living people
Footballers from Naples
Italian footballers
Italy under-21 international footballers
Italy youth international footballers
Association football midfielders
S.S.C. Napoli players
U.S. Cremonese players
Serie A players
Serie B players